Pleuromnema is a genus of moths of the family Geometridae.

References

Ennominae